Birla Institute of Technology, Deoghar is an educational centre offering undergraduate courses located in Deoghar, Jharkhand, India. It is an extension center of BIT, Mesra, Ranchi.

History 
Birla Institute of Technology, Deoghar Campus was established in 2007, on the request of Govt.of Jharkhand. The institute is controlled administratively and academically by BIT Mesra.

Academic programmes 
The following undergraduate courses are conducted at BIT Deoghar:
 Bachelor of Engineering (B.E.) in Computer Science Engineering
 Bachelor of Engineering (B.E.) in Electrical & Electronics Engineering
 Bachelor of Engineering (B.E.) in Electronics & Communication Engineering
 Bachelor of Engineering (B.E.) in Mechanical Engineering.
 Bachelor of Engineering (B.E.) in Production Engineering.

Also some new Courses have been Started from the Session (2020-2021).

 Bachelor of Business Administration (BBA).
 Bachelor of Computer Application (BCA).

Admissions 
The student admission in Engineering courses are done through a merit list based on CRL Rank in JEE Main conducted by NTA.

It was decided that 50% seats would be for students acquiring eligible qualifications from institutions located in Jharkhand while the remaining 50% would be for students from the other states of the country.

Campus 

The campus is located in Deoghar district, 2 km from Jasidih railway station. Deoghar is a tourist spot which has a religious background. It is well known for Baidyanath Dham Temple temple of Lord Shiva.

The campus has 25 acres of academic space, staff quarters, two boys' hostel and one girls' hostel, dispensary, playground, library, gymnasium, canteen and stationery shop. It also has an SBI ATM facility.

Festivals

Utthaan 

Utthaan is the technocultural festival of the BIT-Deoghar. Events include Robotics, Workshops, Fashionista, BIT-MUN, Nukkad Natak, BIT Radio, CS GO, Roadies and Pro night. Special guest appearances at Utthaan have included Dev Negi (playback singer) Geet Sagar (X-Factor India).

Aurora

It is the annual fest of the Literary Society, It includes scavenger hunts, extempore and quizzes.

Dandiya Night 

Dandiya Night is the festival of BIT-Deoghar. It is a night and event filled with colors of joy and happiness among all the glittering faces in ethnic costumes.

Aagaaz 

Aagaaz is the cultural festival of BIT-D, which seeks to bring out new talents of student. It was first held in 2017. The festival includes events in the fields of music, dance and spoken arts.

Club and societies  
 IEEE Student Branch
 Automobile Society
 DRISTI 
 Photographic Society
 Literary Society
 Sports Club
 Music Society
 Cinematic Club
 NAPS BITD
Dramatic society
Robotics Society

External links 

 Official website
 BITD on Facebook
 Faculty list 
Anshuman Tripathi Profile 
Abhishek sharma Profile 
 IEEE Student Branch BIT Deoghar
https://www.anl.gov/article/qa-with-romit-maulik-the-alcfs-margaret-butler-fellow 

Deoghar
Engineering colleges in Jharkhand
Deoghar
All India Council for Technical Education
Educational institutions established in 2007
2007 establishments in Jharkhand